Exo One is a sci-fi adventure video game developed by Australian developer Exbleative and published by Future Friends Games for Xbox One, Xbox Series X/S, and Microsoft Windows via Steam, Epic Games Store, and Microsoft Store. The game launched on November 18, 2021. It is scheduled to launch on PlayStation 4 and PlayStation 5 during Q3 2022.

Gameplay
Premising humanity's first mission outside the Solar System, players take control of an alien spacecraft and travel across the surface of surreal worlds.  The craft utilizes three modes of movement; roll, glide and fly; to gather momentum and propel forward, enabling players to explore the skies or dive into the oceans of a particular planet. Exploration is highlighted by an electric guitar soundtrack as well as a vocal narration delving into the game's story.

Development
Influenced by momentum-based titles like iOS mobile game Tiny Wings, as well as atmospheric indie adventure Journey, lead developer Jay Weston began full-time work on Exo One in early 2016, and launched a successful Kickstarter campaign for the project in 2017. In addition, Tim Mcburnie served as a conceptual artist for the game, musician Rhys Lindsay provided the soundtrack, while programmer Dave Kazi assisted Weston with coding.

Reception

Exo One received "generally favorable" reviews, according to review aggregator Metacritic.

Notes

References

External links
 

2021 video games
Video games developed in Australia
Windows games
Xbox One games
Xbox Series X and Series S games
Science fiction video games
Single-player video games
Kickstarter-funded video games
Indie video games
Space simulators
All in! Games games